Liyakath Ali Khan (Liaguat Ali khan) is an Indian film director and screenwriter who has worked on Tamil films. He was primarily active in the 1990s, collaborating with Vijayakanth and R. K. Selvamani for several films in the politics genre.He also acted in arase serial.

Personal life
In 2006, Liaquat Ali Khan pledged his allegiance to the political party, All India Anna Dravida Munnetra Kazhagam. The move came after his friend and confidante Vijayakanth left him out of his newly floated political party. He was also appointed as Electoral Officer to conduct Small Screen Actors Association Polls.

Filmography
Director

Writer
Films apart from the above where Liaquat Ali Khan received writing credits.

Annai En Deivam
Poonthotta Kaavalkaaran (1988)
Uzhaithu Vaazha Vendum (1988)
Thaai Paasam (1988)
Thangachi (1988)
Aatha Naan Pass Ayittaen (1990)
Pulan Visaranai (1990)
Captain Prabhakaran (1991)
Vetri Padigal (1991)
Maanagara Kaaval (1991)
Moondrezhuthil En Moochirukkum (1991)
Thai Mozhi (1992)
Sakkarai Devan (1993)
Makkal Aatchi (1995)
Delhi Diary (1996)
Thadayam (1997)
Aravindhan (1997)
Arasiyal (1997)
Aasai Thambi (1998)
Ulavuthurai (1998)
Unmai (1998)
Mannavaru Chinnavaru (1999)
Shanmuga Pandian (2000)
Bharath Rathna (2000)
Vaanchinathan (2001)
Gajendra (2004)
Kuttrapathirikai (2007)
Pulan Visaranai 2 (2015)

References

External links

Living people
20th-century Indian film directors
Tamil film directors
Tamil screenwriters
Tamil-language film directors
Year of birth missing (living people)